The Northern Michigan Football League is an interscholastic athletic conference affiliated with the Michigan High School Athletic Association. It is located in Northern Michigan and contains twenty teams that encompasses fourteen counties: Antrim, Benzie, Charlevoix, Cheboygan, Chippewa, Crawford, Emmet, Grand Traverse, Iosco, Kalkaska, Leelanau, Mackinac, Ogemaw and Otsego.

History
The League formed from the merger of the Lake Michigan Conference and the Northwest Conference, for football only. The schools were then split up based on enrollment and competitiveness, with the larger schools forming the Legends Division, and the smaller ones forming the Legacy Division. Mesick, who was a member of the Northwest Conference, declined to join the league, leaving the Legacy Division with one school less than the Legend Division. Before the 2015 season, it was announced that the six members of the Ski Valley Conference not dropping to Eight-man Football as well as Cheboygan, Onekema and Traverse City Christian High Schools would join the league during the 2016 season, causing the league to expand to three divisions; the Leaders, Legends, and Legacy divisions. The league is also considering the applications of several other schools, and the possibility of further divisions to help with travel costs.  On October 6, 2015, Traverse City Christian announced that it would not be joining the NMFL and that Mesick would be replacing them in the conference on a two-year trial basis.

For the 2017 season, more changes will be happening, as four schools will be making the move to eight-man football. In the last few months of 2016, Central Lake, Mesick, Onekama, and Suttons Bay all announced moves to the eight-man game. However, for the 2018 season, Newberry, from the former Mid Eastern Football Conference, was brought into the league. This did not last long, however, as for the 2019 season, Newberry, along with Gaylord St. Mary announced their own move to the 8 man game as well. Starting in 2020, the league will welcome Sault Ste. Marie and West Branch-Ogemaw Heights, who both previously were independent. In corresponding moved Kalkaska and Boyne city will move from the Legends Division to the Leaders Division, and Frankfort will move from the Leaders Division to the Legacy Division. This aligns the league, with the exception of Traverse City St. Francis, to divisions based on enrollment sizes, with the Legends being the largest, Leaders being the middle, and Legacy being the smallest schools.

Effective 2021, the NMFL added 2 new schools, Tawas & Oscoda. Tawas was added to the largest division, Legends, while Oscoda was added to the smallest division, Legacy. Former North Star League foes Rogers City & Lincoln-Alcona were both originally set the join the Legacy Division, but opted instead to drop to 8-Man Football. 

In September of 2021, following the departure of the two Traverse City high schools to the Saginaw Valley League, the four remaining Big North Conference high schools: Alpena, Gaylord, Cadillac, and Petoskey, were denied entry into the league, despite approval of the conferences athletic directors. The eight superintendents of the then Legends Division declined the addition of the four schools, Citing how the league has grown fast and changed so much in the last six years it might be best to slow down before overhauling the league. The addition of the four schools would have saw the creation of a new 4th division, the Liberty Division and would have included the 6 biggest schools, Alpena, Petoskey, Gaylord, Cadillac, Sault Ste. Marie, and Cheboygan. The following 18 teams would have been divided into 3 equal divisions of 6 teams based on size and success. Instead, the conference kept its 3 division format, but saw Tawas moved to the middle Leaders division and Glen Lake moved to the smaller Legacy Division. 

In September 2022 it was announced that effective Fall 2023, the Big North Conference would add Marquette, Escanaba and NMFL member, Sault Ste. Marie, as football members only.

Member schools

Current members

Future members

Former members

Football Champions

State Championship Appearances

Membership Timeline

References

External links
Boyne City Public Schools
Charlevoix Public Schools
East Jordan Public Schools
Elk Rapids Public Schools
Grayling Public Schools
Harbor Springs Public Schools
Kalkaska Public Schools
Grand Traverse Catholic Schools
Glen Lake Community Schools
Kingsley Area Schools
Benzie Schools
Frankfort-Elberta Area Schools
Suttons Bay Public Schools
Onekama Consolidated Schools
Cheboygan Area Schools

Michigan high school sports conferences
High school sports conferences and leagues in the United States
Northern Michigan
2014 establishments in Michigan
American football in Michigan